Junius P. Rodriguez is a professor of history at Eureka College in Eureka, Illinois, who has been the general editor of multiple major reference books on the history of slavery in the United States and the world, as well as related topics such as black history and abolitionism. His work on the history of slavery was acclaimed as "outstanding" by other scholars and by librarians, who have recommended it as part of the core collection for every academic library and many public libraries as well.

In July 2017, Rodriguez announced his candidacy for the U.S. House representing Illinois's 18th congressional district in the 2018 U.S. federal midterm election, but lost to incumbent Republican Darin LaHood.

Career
Rodriguez grew up in Louisiana. After earning his B.A. from Nicholls State University (1979), he taught in the public school system of Lafourche Parish, Louisiana, for nearly a decade. Rodriguez served a term as Parish Councilman in Lafourche Parish from 1979-1983.

Rodriguez earned his M.A. from Louisiana State University (1987), and Ph.D. from Auburn University (1992). Rodriguez has been a professor of history at Eureka College since 1992. John Greenfieldt and Patrice Bartell recommended his Encyclopedia of Slave Resistance and Rebellion for public library core collections.

Rodriguez consulted on the development of the documentary Human Bondage, which aired as part of the History Channel's History's Mysteries series in 2000. In 2002, he helped draw national attention to the 500th anniversary of the beginning of the transatlantic slave trade. Journalist DeWayne Wickham described his efforts as "a perfect teachable moment for discussion and reflection" that was fitting for the event.

Rodriguez unsuccessfully challenged incumbent Republican congressman Darin LaHood of Illinois's 18th congressional district in 2016, running as a Democrat. He won 27.9% of the vote to LaHood's 72.1%.  His number of votes was the second most ever earned by a Democrat in the Illinois 18th District, despite running as a vacancy appointment on a shortened campaign schedule.

Works
The Historical Encyclopedia of World Slavery, two volumes (1997) – ABC-CLIO 
Review: and h
Reviews Journal of Southern History,
Chronology of World Slavery (1999) – ABC-CLIO
The Louisiana Purchase: A Historical and Geographical Encyclopedia (2002) – ABC-CLIO
Encyclopedia of Slave Resistance and Rebellion, two volumes (2007) - Greenwood
Review: Booklist 
Review:  Public library core collection 
Slavery in the United States: A Social, Political, and Historical Encyclopedia, two volumes (2007) – ABC-CLIO
Reviews: Library Media Connection 
Encyclopedia of Emancipation and Abolition in the Transatlantic World, three volumes (2007) 
Reviews: Against the Grain 
 Slavery in the Modern World: A History of Political, Social, and Economic Oppression (ABC-CLIO, 2 vol 2011)

In 2000, Chronology of World Slavery, was included in  "Outstanding reference sources 2000", from the American Library Association.

References

External links
Encyclopedia of Emancipation and Abolition in the Transatlantic World — official page at the Routledge web site.
 Encyclopedia of Slave Resistance and Rebellion — official page at the ABC-CLIO web site.
 Chronology of World Slavery (1999)— official page at the ABC-CLIO web site.
Rodriguez for Congress - campaign web site

21st-century American historians
21st-century American male writers
Auburn University alumni
Eureka College faculty
Illinois Democrats
Living people
Louisiana State University alumni
Nicholls State University alumni
Parish jurors and commissioners in Louisiana
People from Thibodaux, Louisiana
Year of birth missing (living people)
Candidates in the 2018 United States elections
Historians from Louisiana
American male non-fiction writers